Sarsina  is a genus of moths in the subfamily Lymantriinae. The genus was erected by Francis Walker in 1855.

Species
Sarsina avertina Schaus, 1927 Mexico
Sarsina dirphioides (Walker, 1865) French Guiana
Sarsina electa (Schaus, 1912) Costa Rica
Sarsina festiva (Schaus, 1912) Costa Rica
Sarsina purpurascens Walker, 1855 Mexico
Sarsina violascens (Herrich-Schäffer, [1856]) Brazil
Sarsina violetta Schaus, 1927 Paraguay

References

Lymantriini